In Person (also known as Vince Guaraldi "In Person") is a live performance album by jazz pianist Vince Guaraldi, released in the U.S. on June 10, 1963 on Fantasy Records. It was released as a follow-up to his album Jazz Impressions of Black Orpheus which featured the surprise hit song "Cast Your Fate to the Wind".

The concert was recorded live at The Trident Jazz Club in Sausalito, California, on December 4, 1962.

Reception

Contemporary
Cashbox magazine cited the single "Zelao"/"Jitterbug Waltz" from In Person as a Best Bet: "Vince Guaraldi, who scored last time out with 'Cast Your Fate to the Winds' [sic], could duplicate that success with this top-flight bossa nova follow-up stanza. The tune is a contagious, easy-going lyrical ballad with a danceable, rapidly-changing beat."

In the album's liner notes, Ralph J. Gleason praised Guaraldi's performance style, noting, "What Vince has got in his playing is feeling. This is a quality that money can't buy, practice cannot make perfect and technique tends to defeat rather than enhance. Vince sings when he plays. I don't mean he grunts or hums or even makes a noise at all. I mean his fingers sing, the music sings, and he writhes and twists on the piano stool like a balancing act in the circus."

Retrospective
AllMusic critic Richard S. Ginell called In Person "a defining album for Guaraldi in his natural habitat" (a jazz club setting), adding that the album captures the musician "at his most winning."

Why It Matters blogger James Stafford cited In Person as capturing "the pianist in that brief moment when he was enjoying his first great national success with 'Cast Your Fate To the Wind' but hadn’t yet been transformed into a household name by Peanuts. It’s a beautiful record, filled with blues, bebop, and bossa nova, but for sheer plaster-a-smile-on-your-face delight nothing beats his take on the Mediterranean traditional song 'Misirlou'."

Track listing

Personnel 
Vince Guaraldi Quintet
 Vince Guaraldi – piano
 Eddie Duran – guitars
 Fred Marshall – double bass
 Colin Bailey – drums
 Benny Valarde – güiro

Additional
 Ralph J. Gleason – liner notes

Release history

References

External links 
 

1963 live albums
Albums arranged by Vince Guaraldi
Fantasy Records live albums
Vince Guaraldi albums
Vince Guaraldi live albums